Terry L. Mattingly (born January 31, 1954) is a journalist, author, and professor. As columnist for the Scripps Howard News Service, Mattingly has written "On Religion", a nationally syndicated column, since the summer of 1988. Mattingly also runs a well-known religious journalism blog, GetReligion.

Mattingly was also Director of The Washington Journalism Center, a program run by the Council for Christian Colleges and Universities.

Early life
Mattingly was raised by a father who was a Southern Baptist pastor. He was involved in Boy Scouts as a youth. Mattingly attended Thomas Jefferson High School in Port Arthur, Texas. He later attended Baylor University earning his B.A. in Journalism and American History (1976) and his M.A. in Church-State Studies (1984). He then earned his M.S. in Journalism at University of Illinois at Urbana-Champaign (1982).

Career
Mattingly's first major break was with the Champaign-Urbana News-Gazette. As a staff writer and copy editor, he wrote Backbeat, a rock 'n' roll column. While writing Backbeat, one of Mattingly's subjects included a 1982 tour by U2.

From 1982-1984, Mattingly worked for The Charlotte News and later The Charlotte Observer, and from 1984–1990, he was a religion writer for the Rocky Mountain News in Denver.   He taught at Milligan College.

Since 1988, Mattingly has been a religion columnist for On Religion at the Scripps Howard News Service in Washington, D.C. Mattingly also runs a well-known religious journalism blog, GetReligion.

As the current Director of the Washington Journalism Center, Mattingly teaches journalism to students in Washington, D.C. Mattingly has a long association with Howard Ahmanson Jr. and his wife, Roberta, dating back to Roberta's tenure as a religion reporter for the Orange County Register in the late 1980s. Roberta was an original financial backer of GetReligion and Ahmanson has funded the Washington Journalism Center and the Oxford Centre for Religion and Public Life, which currently hosts the website.

After leaving the Southern Baptist Convention, the christian body in which he was raised, Mattingly was for a time a member of The Episcopal Church. Mattingly goes by the nickname of TMatt and often refers to himself a prodigal Texan. He is a practicing Orthodox Christian, a member of the Antiochian Orthodox Archdiocese of North America.

Mattingly is a supporter of the American Solidarity Party.

Books
Mattingly's first book was titled Pop Goes Religion: Faith in Popular Culture.

References

External links
 Terry Mattingly's personal web page

1954 births
Living people
American Christian democrats
American columnists
E. W. Scripps Company people
Eastern Orthodox Christians from the United States
People from Port Arthur, Texas
American religious writers
Members of the Greek Orthodox Church of Antioch
Converts to Eastern Orthodoxy from Protestantism
American male bloggers
American bloggers
Baylor University alumni
University of Illinois Urbana-Champaign College of Media alumni
American journalism academics
Journalists from Texas
21st-century American non-fiction writers
Religion journalists
Former Baptists
Former Anglicans